David Clancy Armitage (born 16 June 1988) is a former Australian rules footballer who played for the St Kilda Football Club in the Australian Football League (AFL).

Early life and junior football 
Armitage was born in Mackay, Queensland. Despite growing up in a rugby league stronghold city, Armitage played Australian rules football in his younger years. His father, Greg, was an avid Australian rules fan and introduced him to the game at a young age. He played his junior football for the Eastern Swans in the AFL Mackay competition. He made his senior debut for the Swans in 2002 at 14 years old and kicked five goals against Bakers Creek. In 2005, at the age of 16, he made the decision to move to Brisbane and play for Morningside in the hope of increasing his chances of getting drafted to an AFL club. While at Morningside, he represented the under 18s Queensland team several times and played alongside future AFL players Courtenay Dempsey and Lee Spurr. He also competed in the 2005 QAFL Grand Final. The decision paid off as he was drafted to St Kilda with the 9th pick in the 2006 AFL draft.

AFL career 
Armitage made his AFL debut in Round 8, 2007 against Hawthorn. He played in St Kilda’s 2008 NAB Cup winning side, the club's third preseason cup win. He played in three of 22 matches in the 2009 season's home and away rounds in which St Kilda qualified in first position for the finals series, winning the club’s third minor premiership. He became a regular player in St Kilda's midfield from the 2011 season.

After his 2014 season had been interrupted by injury, Armitage planned with St Kilda coach Alan Richardon and committed to shedding excess muscle to re-design himself as a player, modeling himself after Hawthorn premiership player Jordan Lewis. In 2015 pre-season training he emphasized his running rather than his weight-lifting and shed five kilograms of weight, which led to a major improvement in his game, and he enjoyed career-best form in the 2015 season. He played almost every game of the season for St Kilda, in August he was one of the top five in the AFL for possessions, and he filled in as captain for three games in the absence of Nick Riewoldt. Already contracted until for 2016, he signed a three-year contract extension to stay at the club until the end of 2019. He finished off the season having played 21 out of 22 games for St Kilda and came second in the Trevor Barker Award, St Kilda's best and fairest, as well as polling 12 votes in the Brownlow Medal.

In 2017 Armitage struggled with a groin injury, which required surgery and sidelined him from all but 2 of St Kilda's matches for the year. His final years at the club were hampered by injury and he finished the 2019 season on the sidelines due to concussion. He retired at the end of the 2019 season.

Statistics
 Statistics are correct to end of 2019

|- style="background-color: #EAEAEA"
! scope="row" style="text-align:center" | 2007
|style="text-align:center;"|
| 20 || 3 || 0 || 0 || 11 || 9 || 20 || 7 || 7 || 0.0 || 0.0 || 3.7 || 3.0 || 6.7 || 2.3 || 2.3
|- 
! scope="row" style="text-align:center" | 2008
|style="text-align:center;"|
| 20 || 13 || 10 || 6 || 77 || 56 || 133 || 39 || 43 || 0.8 || 0.5 || 5.9 || 4.3 || 10.2 || 3.0 || 3.3
|- style="background:#eaeaea;"
! scope="row" style="text-align:center" | 2009
|style="text-align:center;"|
| 20 || 3 || 3 || 1 || 30 || 17 || 47 || 9 || 26 || 1.0 || 0.3 || 10.0 || 5.7 || 15.7 || 3.0 || 8.7
|- 
! scope="row" style="text-align:center" | 2010
|style="text-align:center;"|
| 20 || 9 || 4 || 2 || 64 || 77 || 141 || 29 || 50 || 0.4 || 0.2 || 7.1 || 8.6 || 15.7 || 3.2 || 5.6
|- style="background:#eaeaea;"
! scope="row" style="text-align:center" | 2011
|style="text-align:center;"|
| 20 || 22 || 12 || 12 || 180 || 156 || 336 || 63 || 99 || 0.5 || 0.5 || 8.2 || 7.1 || 15.3 || 2.9 || 4.5
|- 
! scope="row" style="text-align:center" | 2012
|style="text-align:center;"|
| 20 || 21 || 17 || 8 || 275 || 151 || 426 || 100 || 98 || 0.8 || 0.4 || 13.1 || 7.2 || 20.3 || 4.8 || 4.7
|- style="background:#eaeaea;"
! scope="row" style="text-align:center" | 2013
|style="text-align:center;"|
| 20 || 21 || 10 || 10 || 248 || 209 || 457 || 71 || 115 || 0.5 || 0.5 || 11.8 || 10.0 || 21.8 || 3.4 || 5.5
|- 
! scope="row" style="text-align:center" | 2014
|style="text-align:center;"|
| 20 || 15 || 11 || 6 || 176 || 154 || 330 || 59 || 67 || 0.7 || 0.4 || 11.7 || 10.3 || 22.0 || 3.9 || 4.5
|- style="background:#eaeaea;"
! scope="row" style="text-align:center" | 2015
|style="text-align:center;"|
| 20 || 21 || 11 || 12 || 282 || 315 || 597 || 83 || 125 || 0.5 || 0.7 || 13.4 || 15.0 || 28.4 || 4.0 || 6.0
|- 
! scope="row" style="text-align:center" | 2016
|style="text-align:center;"|
| 20 || 22 || 11 || 2 || 214 || 264 || 478 || 78 || 125 || 0.5 || 0.1 || 9.7 || 12.0 || 21.7 || 3.6 || 5.7
|- style="background:#eaeaea;"
! scope="row" style="text-align:center" | 2017
|style="text-align:center;"|
| 20 || 2 || 1 || 1 || 18 || 15 || 33 || 9 || 8 || 0.5 || 0.5 || 9.0 || 7.5 || 16.5 || 4.5 || 4.0
|- 
! scope="row" style="text-align:center" | 2018
|style="text-align:center;"|
| 20 || 15 || 8 || 11 || 152 || 147 || 299 || 70 || 43 || 0.5 || 0.7 || 10.1 || 9.8 || 19.9 || 4.7 || 2.9
|- style="background:#eaeaea;"
! scope="row" style="text-align:center" | 2019
|style="text-align:center;"|
| 20 || 2 || 0 || 0 || 20 || 13 || 33 || 8 || 6 || 0.0 || 0.0 || 10.0 || 6.5 || 16.5 || 4.0 || 3.0
|- class="sortbottom"
! colspan=3| Career
! 169
! 98
! 71
! 1747
! 1583
! 3330
! 625
! 812
! 0.6
! 0.4
! 10.3
! 9.3
! 19.7
! 3.7
! 4.8
|}

References

External links

Sportspeople from Mackay, Queensland
Australian rules footballers from Queensland
St Kilda Football Club players
Morningside Australian Football Club players
Living people
1988 births
Sandringham Football Club players